The Alfa Romeo MiTo (Type 955) is a front-wheel drive, three-door supermini designed by Centro Stile Alfa Romeo and presented in 2008 at Castello Sforzesco in Milan with an international introduction at the British Motor Show in 2008. The MiTo was marketed across a single generation from 2008 to 2018, sharing the Fiat Small platform with the  Fiat Grande Punto. Production reached 293,428 at FCA's Mirafiori plant.

The Mito nameplate is a portmanteau of Milano (Milan), where it was designed, and Torino (Turin), where it was manufactured.

Naming 

The new car was provisionally named the "Junior". In November 2007, Alfa Romeo launched a European public naming competition; the winner from each country to win an Alfa Romeo Spider or an Alfa Romeo mountain bike. The winning name was "Furiosa", which scored well in Italy, France, United Kingdom and Germany, but not in Spain.

In 2008, Alfa Romeo announced "MiTo" as the official name, a portmanteau of Milano (Milan) & Torino (Turin), because it was designed in the former and was assembled in the latter. The name is also a play on the Italian word "mito", meaning "myth" or "legend".

Design and updates 

The MiTo is front-wheel drive, with a  system allowing the driver to choose three driving settings: Dynamic, Normal, and All-Weather. The system, marketed as "Alfa DNA," tunes the behavior of the engine, brakes, steering, suspension and gearbox. The MiTo also features a Q2 electronic differential on the front wheels, which is active with the DNA switch in Dynamic position, and allows for faster and tighter cornering without loss of traction.

In 2010 a new transmission for the MiTo was unveiled at the 2010 Geneva Motor Show, the six-speed TCT which is produced by Fiat Powertrain Technologies in Verrone (TCT Dual Dry Clutch Transmission). Magneti Marelli delivers the control system which integrates BorgWarner's hydraulic actuation module into its own power and transmission control units. It can handle torque inputs of up to 

In Geneva was also unveiled Blue&Me–TomTom, this new system integrates TomTom navigation to the Blue&Me infotelematic system.

For model year 2014, the MiTo gets a new 105 PS 0.9 L Turbo TwinAir engine, new chrome-plated grille, new Anthracite grey colour and new burnished front light clusters. The car interior is also updated with new upholsteries, three new dashboards looks, as well as the new Uconnect 5.0 infotainment systems. The engine range now consists two turbo diesel engines (the updated E5+ 85 PS 1.3 L JTDM and the 120 PS 1.6 L JTDM) and five petrol engines: the 70 PS 1.4, the 78 PS 1.4, the 135 PS 1.4 MultiAir Turbo (with manual or Alfa TCT Dual Dry Clutch Transmission) and the 170 PS 1.4 MultiAir Turbo.  The range has also 120 HP 1.4 LPG Turbo option.

Debuting at the 2016  2016 Geneva Motor Show, the revised Mito featured a facelifted front fascia with a new updated brand logo and new lettering. Trim line up was changed to Mito, Super and Veloce. A new body colour and new rims designs also became available. The previous MiTo QV became the Mito Veloce, available with 170 PS engine and TCT transmission.

MiTo Quadrifoglio Verde 
The Quadrifoglio Verde (green four-leaf clover) has traditionally been the highest line of Alfa Romeo models. The car (see Alfa Romeo in motorsport article for the history of this emblem) version of Mito was presented at the 2009 Frankfurt Motor Show. Its specific output of 124 PS per litre was highest in its segment at that time. QV had bigger 305 mm front brake discs and exclusive 18" alloy wheels as standard and Sabelt carbon fibre backed bucket seats as an option. From 2014 QV was now available with TCT robotised gearbox which brought down the 0–100 km/h time to 7.3 s. With 2016 facelift QV was renamed as Veloce.

Engines 

At its launch the MiTo featured low-displacement turbocharged petrol and diesel engines. Also, a power limited  naturally aspirated engine variant is produced to meet the new Italian legislation for young people. MiTo got new electro-hydraulic valve control system Multiair engines from September 2009. MultiAir engines will increase power (up to 10%) and torque (up to 15%), as well as a considerable reduction in consumption levels (up to 10%) and CO2 emissions (up to 10%), of particulates (up to 40%) and NOx (up to 60%). All multiair versions have start-stop system as standard. The LPG version is made in collaboration with Landi Renzo. In Summer 2010 Alfa introduced the Dual Dry Clutch Transmission called Alfa TCT ( i.e. Twin Clutch Transmission ). From model year 2011 the start-stop system came as standard on all versions. At the 2011 Frankfurt Motor Show, AR introduced two new engines for the MiTo – The 0.9 L I2 TwinAir and a new low emission  version of 1.3 JTD diesel engine.

Specifications

Fuel consumption and CO2 emissions

Safety 
The MiTo has seven airbags as standard, and received a 'good' or green result from the first ever Euro NCAP rear impact test (whiplash).

The MiTo received the following ratings:

Limited and special editions 

Edizione Sprint (2009): Limited to 250 examples, only for Belgian market. Available only with 1.3 JTDM  diesel engine. Bears special Sprint logo.

Maserati Version (2010): In 2010 Alfa Romeo announced it would produce a limited 100 car series of Mitos to be distributed to Maserati dealerships in Europe. Maserati version MiTos feature same 125 kW (170 PS) engine as the Quadrifoglio Verde, and exclusive paint Blu Oceano. Aluminium kickplates and a badge on the HVAC controls on the car bear words "Alfa Romeo for Maserati". The cars are to be used as courtesy cars for Maserati service customers, very much like "for Ferrari Dealers" versions of the Fiat 500 and Abarth 500.

Quadrifoglio Verde 101 (2012): Limited edition based on QV model, only 101 examples to celebrate 101 anniversary of Alfa Romeo existence. Rosso Alfa paint,  engine, Sabelt racing seats with Alcantara upholstery and backrest made of carbon. From the outside, apart from paint and tinted windows, the car also sports new 18-inch alloy wheels available, like the seats, exclusively for this model. Also as standard bi-xenon lights, Brembo brakes and active suspension "Dynamic Suspension".

MiTo SBK and MiTo Superbike Special Series: At the 2012 Paris Motor Show, Alfa Romeo unveiled numbered limited edition (200 Units) MiTo SBK based on the 1.4 L  QV MiTo and the MiTo Superbike Special Series available with all the engines in the range – except for the 1.4 70 PS and 1.4 170 PS petrol engine. This version includes 16-inch titanium alloy wheels, chrome-plated spoiler and exhaust, mirror fairings in the shade of titanium, sporty rear bumper, black fog light frame and "SBK" logo on the rear of the car.

Mito Racer: Introduced at Geneva 2015 motor show, MiTo Racer version sports a checkered flag roof sticker, special 17" alloy wheels, rear sport bumper, rear spoiler, chromed exhaust-pipe and satin-chrome finish for many exterior features. Interior will be available with vintage looking grey textile with brown eco-leather seats and black dashboard. Available with wide range of engines.

GTA concept car 

The GTA (Gran Turismo Alleggerita), the sportiest version of the MiTo, was unveiled at the March 2009 Geneva Motor Show as a prototype. The concept has a 1.8-litre (Fiat Pratola Serra modular) turbocharged engine with direct fuel injection and variable valve timing for both inlet and exhaust. The weight of the GTA has been reduced by the use of carbon-fibre for the tailgate spoiler as well as the roof panel and mirror fairings. Aluminium is also used to reduce the weight.

MiTo FCEV 
Two Alfa Romeo MiTo Fuel Cell vehicles were used in Hydrogen test program in Europe.
The Alfa Romeo MiTo Fuel Cell car uses a Nuvera Fuel Cell stack combined with a compact Li-ion traction battery pack to supply power to the electric motor; vehicle has top speed of 150 km/h (93 mph) and can accelerate from 0 to 100 kilometers in 10 seconds, with hydrogen consumption of 3.2 liters diesel equivalent/100 km (74 mpg US) and a range of 450 kilometers (280 miles) in NEDC, thanks to 700 bar H2 tanks.”

Reception
The MiTo was sold to compete with the MINI and the newer Audi A1.

In March 2017, the head of Alfa Romeo Reid Bigland said that the MiTo and Giulietta models were going to continue to be produced for the foreseeable future. However, both models sales were discontinued, MiTo in early 2019 and Giulietta in 2021.

Production and sales

Awards 
2013 "Bestes Auto des Jahres 2013" – Import small cars category – Auto, Motor und Sport
2011  Die besten autos 2011 – Import small cars category – Auto, Motor und Sport; What Car? Reader Awards – Supermini category winner; "My favorite cars" Small cars category Quattroruote; Die besten autos 2010 – Import small cars category – Auto, Motor und Sport

References

External links 

 Official MiTo website
 Official MiTo blog
 alfamitoclip.com

Mito
Subcompact cars
2010s cars
Cars introduced in 2008
Euro NCAP superminis
Front-wheel-drive vehicles